Angela Marino (born 3 February 1986) is a former New Zealand professional women's basketball. She has previously represented the Adelaide Lightning, Canberra Capitals and the Perth Lynx.  She has the WNBL championship once in the 2007–08 season with the Adelaide Lightning.

Personal 
Marino was born in Waiuku to Italian parents before moving to Australia as an infant. Her father was the former owner of the Adelaide Lightning, the team she used to play for. Though born in New Zealand, she has represented South Australia at the under 20s level during the Australian National Junior Championships.

International career
Marino represented the Tall Ferns at the 2004 Olympics at 18 years of age, and was selected to participate in the 2008 Beijing Olympics.

References

1986 births
Living people
Adelaide Lightning players
Point guards
Australian women's basketball players
New Zealand women's basketball players
New Zealand people of Italian descent
Australian people of Italian descent
Australian people of New Zealand descent
Olympic basketball players of New Zealand
Basketball players at the 2004 Summer Olympics
Basketball players at the 2008 Summer Olympics
Basketball players at the 2006 Commonwealth Games
Commonwealth Games silver medallists for New Zealand
People from Waiuku
Canberra Capitals players
Perth Lynx players
New Zealand expatriate basketball people in Australia
Commonwealth Games medallists in basketball
Medallists at the 2006 Commonwealth Games